Augusto Ulloa y Castañón (1823 in Santiago de Compostela, Spain – 1879 in Madrid, Spain) was a Spanish lawyer, politician and journalist who served twice as Minister of State, in 1871, during the reign of King Amadeo I, and in 1874, under the presidency of Francisco Serrano, 1st Duke of la Torre, in the First Spanish Republic.

References
www.xtec.es Augusto Ulloa y Castañón

|-
 

|-
 

Foreign ministers of Spain
1823 births
1879 deaths
Constitutional Party (Spain) politicians
Government ministers during the First Spanish Republic